Peter Van Gaasbeck (September 27, 1754 – 1797) was an American merchant and politician from Kingston, New York.

He was born in Ulster County, New York, and educated in Kingston.  During the Revolutionary War he served as a Major in the Ulster County militia.

Van Gaasbeck was a successful merchant. He owned slaves. He was a supporter of the George Washington administration (the group later recognized as the Federalist Party), and was elected to the United States House of Representatives.  He represented New York in the 3rd United States Congress, March 4, 1793 to March 3, 1795.

In 1794 Van Gaasbeck married Sarah Dumont (or Dumond).

He died in Kingston in 1797 and was buried at the First Dutch Reformed Church in Kingston.

His name is sometimes spelled "Van Gaasbeek."

External links

The History of Kingston, New York: From Its Early Settlement to the Year 1820, by Marius Schoonmaker

References

1754 births
1797 deaths
People from Ulster County, New York
People of the Province of New York
American people of Dutch descent
Pro-Administration Party members of the United States House of Representatives from New York (state)
American slave owners
Politicians from Kingston, New York
New York (state) militiamen in the American Revolution
Burials in New York (state)